Euriphene jolyana is a butterfly in the family Nymphalidae. It is found in the Democratic Republic of the Congo.

References

External links
 Type images at Royal Museum for Central Africa

Butterflies described in 1987
Euriphene
Endemic fauna of the Democratic Republic of the Congo
Butterflies of Africa